The 62nd edition of the KNVB Cup started on September 1, 1979. The final was played on May 17, 1980: Feyenoord beat Ajax 3–1 and won the cup for the fifth time. During the quarter and semi-finals, two-legged matches were held.

Teams
 All 18 participants of the Eredivisie 1979-80, entering in the second round
 All 19 participants of the Eerste Divisie 1979-80
 9 teams from lower (amateur) leagues

First round
The matches of the first round were played on September 1 and September 2, 1979.

1 Eerste Divisie; A Amateur teams

Second round
The matches of the second round were played on October 13 and 14, 1979. The Eredivisie clubs entered the tournament here.

E Eredivisie

Round of 16
The matches of the round of 16 were played between February 13 and 17, 1980.

Quarter finals
The quarter finals were played on February 27 and March 12, 1980.

Semi-finals
The semi-finals were played on April 16 and 30, 1980.

Final

Feyenoord would participate in the Cup Winners' Cup.

See also
Eredivisie 1979-80
Eerste Divisie 1979-80

References

External links
 Netherlands Cup Full Results 1970–1994 by the RSSSF

1979-80
1979–80 domestic association football cups
KNVB Cup